The 2018 Asian Women's Club Volleyball Championship was the 19th edition of the Asian Women's Club Volleyball Championship, an international volleyball club tournament organised by the Asian Volleyball Confederation (AVC) with the Volleyball Federation of the Republic of Kazakhstan (VFRK). It was held in Ust-Kamenogorsk, Kazakhstan from 11 to 18 July 2018. The tournament served as the Asian qualifiers for the 2019 FIVB Volleyball Women's Club World Championship with the champion qualifying for the World Championship.

Qualification
Nine clubs from nine AVC member associations participated in the tournament including Kazakhstan, the host country. Of the nine AVC member associations, seven had clubs which participated in the 2017 edition.

Qualified teams
The following teams qualified for the tournament.

Pools composition
This is the first Asian Women's Club Volleyball Championship which will use the new competition format. Following the 2017 AVC Board of Administration's unanimous decision, the new format will see teams being drawn into four pools up to the total amount of the participating teams. Each team as well as the host side will be assigned into a pool according to their 2017 ranking. The three best-ranked teams will be drawn in the same Pool A, the next best four will contest Pool B, the next best three will contest Pool C.

Squads

Preliminary round
All times are in Kazakhstan Standard Time (UTC+06:00).

Pool standing procedure
 Number of matches won
 Match points
 Sets ratio
 Points ratio
 Result of the last match between the tied teams

Match won 3–0 or 3–1: 3 match points for the winner, 0 match points for the loser
Match won 3–2: 2 match points for the winner, 1 match point for the loser
Match forfeited: 0 match points for each.

Pool A

|}

Pool B

|}

Pool C

|}

Final Round

Rankings

Classification round (R5–9)

Section 1

Section 1
Winners will advance to Fifth to Eighth Classification round.
Losers will be ninth place.

|}

Section 2

Section 2
Winners will advance to Fifth to Eighth Classification round.
Losers will advance to Fifth to Eighth Classification round.

|}

Fifth to Eighth Classification Round

Fifth to Eighth places
Winners will advance to Fifth place play-off.
Losers will be given a chance to Seventh place play-off.

|}

Seventh place

|}

Fifth place

|}

Championship round (R1–9)

Play-offs
Winners will advance to Quarter-finals.
Losers will transfer to Classification round (R5–9).

|}

Quarter-finals
Winners will advance to Semi-finals.
Losers will transfer to Classification round (R5–9).

|}

Semi-finals
Winners will advance to Finals.
Losers will be given a chance to Third place play-off .

|}

Third place

|}

Final
Winners will advance to World Championship.

|}

Final standing

Medalists

Awards

Most Valuable Player
   (Supreme Chonburi)
Best Setter
   (Jiangsu Zenith Steel)
Best Outside Spikers
   (Supreme Chonburi)
   (Altay)

Best Middle Blockers
   (Altay)
   (Jiangsu Zenith Steel)
Best Opposite Spiker
   (NEC Red Rockets)
Best Libero 
   (NEC Red Rockets)

References

Asian Women's Club Volleyball Championship
Asian Volleyball Championship
International volleyball competitions hosted by Kazakhstan
2018 in Kazakhstani sport
V